Bergeyella porcorum  is a Gram-negative bacterium from the genus of Bergeyella which has been isolated from the lungs and tonsils of pigs.

References

External links
Type strain of Bergeyella porcorum at BacDive -  the Bacterial Diversity Metadatabase

Flavobacteria
Bacteria described in 2016